The Cambodian film industry hits its peak, producing more movies than ever before.

See also
2006 in Cambodia

References

2006
Films
Cambodian